A ball and chain is a type of restraint device.

Ball and chain may also refer to:

Film and television
 Ball & Chain, a 2004 American film directed by Shiraz Jafri
 "Ball and Chain" (Haven), a television episode

Songs
 "Ball and Chain" (Big Mama Thornton song), 1968; covered by Janis Joplin
 "Ball and Chain" (Elton John song), 1982
 "Ball and Chain" (Paul Overstreet song), 1991
 "Ball and Chain" (Social Distortion song), 1990
 "Ball and Chain" (The Who song), 2019
 "Ball and Chain" (XTC song), 1982
 "Make This Love Right" or "The Ball and Chain", by Romanthony, 1991
 "Ball and Chain", by Aldo Nova from Aldo Nova, 1982
 "Ball and Chain", by Anouk from Who's Your Momma, 2007
 "Ball and Chain", by Barclay James Harvest from "Once Again", 1971
 "Ball and Chain", by Anthony Hamilton from Soulife, 2005
 "Ball and Chain", by Live from The Death of a Dictionary, 1989
 "Ball & Chain", by Martha Wainwright from Martha Wainwright, 2005
 "Ball & Chain", by Murder by Death from Red of Tooth and Claw, 2008
 "Ball and Chain", by Poison from Flesh and Blood, 1990
 "Ball and Chain", by Razor from Armed & Dangerous, 1984
 "Ball and Chain", by Sublime from 40oz. to Freedom, 1992
 "Ball and Chain", by Thunder from Behind Closed Doors, 1995
 "Ball and Chain", by Tommy James, 1970
 "Ball & Chain", by Van Morrison from Too Long in Exile, 1993
 "Ball and Chain", by Yelawolf from Love Story, 2015
 "Ball and Chain", a song from the television series Nashville, 2013

Other uses
 Ball-and-chain flail, a medieval weapon with a spiked ball connected by a chain to a handle
 Ball and chain inactivation, a model to explain the fast inactivation mechanism of voltage-gated ion channels

See also
 Ball chain, a type of chain link
 Hammer throw, a track and field sport with a metal ball attached by a steel wire to a grip
 Meteor hammer, an ancient Chinese weapon consisting of one or two weights connected by a rope or chain
 Wrecking ball, a heavy steel ball hung from a crane that is used for demolishing large buildings